Meeke is a surname. Notable people with the surname include:

Alison Meeke (born 1991), Irish field hockey player
Brent Meeke (born 1952), Canadian ice hockey player
Elizabeth Meeke (1761–c. 1826?), British author
Kris Meeke (born 1979), Northern Irish rally driver
William Meeke (1758–1830), British politician